The Taquari River is a river of Rio Grande do Sul state in southern Brazil. It is a left tributary of the Jacuí River, into which it flows at Triunfo. In its upper course, it is called Rio das Antas.

See also
List of rivers of Rio Grande do Sul

References
Brazilian Ministry of Transport

Rivers of Rio Grande do Sul